Burning My Travels Clean is an album by Rocky Votolato. It was released on April 16, 2002, by the independent label Second Nature Recordings. The album incorporates a number of folk elements (the predominance of acoustic guitar, the use of fiddle, and lyrics centered on the loneliness or isolation of the singer and his impoverished background) but also contains clear strains of rock music. The major themes of the album include his relationship with his wife and his dedication to music. The album received very little press upon its release, going unmentioned by both the independent and mainstream music critic publications.

Track listing
All tracks by Rocky Votolato

 "Crabtree And Evelyn" – 4:06
 "Holding Onto Water" – 3:47
 "October" – 3:03
 "Like Silver" – 4:03
 "Without Eyes Still Seeing" – 1:58
 "Don't Walk Out On Me" – 4:27
 "Treasure Chest" – 4:07
 "Swallowing Swords" – 2:51
 "Like A Mother" – 3:32
 "Deep In The Earth" – 4:42
 "I Remember Music" – 4:13

Personnel 

 Matt Bayles – Producer, Engineer
 Ed Brooks – Mastering
 Dan Dean – Drums, Art Direction, Design
 Jeff Lopez – Photography
 James Mendenhall – Piano
 Kevin Suggs – Pedal Steel
 Rosanne Thomas – Vocals (background)
 Troy Tietjen – Assistant Engineer
 Cody Votolato – Guitar (Electric)
 Rocky Votolato – Guitar, Vocals
 Seth Warren – Violin

References 

2002 albums
Rocky Votolato albums